Mound Creek is a stream in Brown and Cottonwood counties, in the U.S. state of Minnesota.

Mound Creek was named for nearby mounds of quartzite.

See also
List of rivers of Minnesota

References

Rivers of Brown County, Minnesota
Rivers of Cottonwood County, Minnesota
Rivers of Minnesota